William Dana Ewart (April 24, 1851 – May 3, 1908) invented and patented the linked belt, a square detachable link for chain belts, on September 1, 1874.  The metal chain "linked belt" replaced the leather and strap belts used on agricultural equipment at the time.

A resident of Belle Plaine, Iowa, Ewart was a farm-implement dealer when he conceived of the idea. In 1875, Ewart established the Ewart Manufacturing Co. in Belle Plaine, Iowa.  In 1880 he founded the Link-Belt Machinery Company and in 1888 the Link-Belt Engineering Company. In the early 1890s, Ewart's companies produced the first wide-gauge, steam-powered, coal-handling clamshell crane, the further development of which would eventually lead to the modern Link-Belt construction equipment.  Link-Belt chain drives were used in a variety of applications, including auto assembly lines, coal mining, concrete mixers, and agricultural machinery.

Ewart was inducted into the Association of Equipment Manufacturers Hall of Fame
in 1996 at CONEXPO-CONAGG.

References 

19th-century American inventors
People from Belle Plaine, Iowa
1851 births
1908 deaths